Hans Zehrer (pseud. Hans Thomas; 22 June 1899 – 23 August 1966) was a German philosopher and journalist. He edited a leading right-wing journal, Die Tat, and founded the Tat Circle.

Biography
Zehrer was born in Berlin to a postal official.  In 1917 Zehrer enlisted as a soldier and remained so after the First World War. He took part in the Kapp Putsch of 1920.

Zehrer studied at Berlin University before becoming a journalist.  From 1923 till 1929 he was editor of the paper the Vossische Zeitung. His political thinking was influenced by Arthur Moeller van den Bruck; he also admired Vilfredo Pareto and Henri de Man.  He became an editor of Die Tat in 1930, which under his direction saw its circulation grow dramatically. To prevent coming under control of the NSDAP, Zehrer introduced a varied group of writers to the magazine, like Gregor Strasser and Kurt von Schleicher.

With Hitler in power in 1934 (Strasser and Schleicher being murdered in the Night of the Long Knives) Zehrer relinquished himself from editorial duties (Zehrer was married to a Jewish woman until 1938) and retired to the island Sylt. Zehrer returned to Berlin and became the manager of the Stalling publishing house in 1938.

From 1943 to 1945 Zehrer was a soldier in the Luftwaffe, but saw no active service. In 1946 he briefly worked for the then British controlled Die Welt. He was chief editor of the Sonntagsblatt from 1948 to 1953, after which he became chief editor at Die Welt (taken over by Axel Springer in that year). He also was a columnist for the Bild-Zeitung.

He died in Berlin.

Works Translated into English, Partial List 

 Man in this World (1952, abridged)

References

 Biographical Dictionary of the Extreme Right Since 1890 edited by Philip Rees (1991), pp. 417–418.

External links
 
 Hans Zehrer as a Neoconservative Elite Theorist by Walter Struve, The American Historical Review, Vol. 70, No. 4 (Jul., 1965), pp. 1035–1057.

1899 births
1966 deaths
Writers from Berlin
German male journalists
German newspaper journalists
Conservative Revolutionary movement
German Army personnel of World War I
Luftwaffe personnel of World War II
Kapp Putsch participants
German male writers
Die Welt editors
Bild people
Commanders Crosses of the Order of Merit of the Federal Republic of Germany
20th-century German journalists
German Christians
Christian philosophers